The 1929 Denver Pioneers football team was an American football team that represented the University of Denver as a member of the Rocky Mountain Conference (RMC) during the 1929 college football season. In their first season under head coach Jeff Cravath, the Pioneers compiled a 5–1–1 record (4–1–1 against conference opponents), tied for second in the RMC, and outscored opponents by a total of 92 to 33.

Schedule

References

Denver
Denver Pioneers football seasons
Denver Pioneers football